Theodore Hetzler, Sr. (June 13, 1875 - August 12, 1945) was president and later chairman of the board of the Fifth Avenue Bank.

Biography
He was born on June 13, 1875. He married Mary Regis Smith and they had a son, Theodore Hetzler, Jr.

He started work at the Fifth Avenue Bank as a messenger. In 1914 he was working as a cashier and was promoted to a vice president. In 1916 he was named president.

He died on August 12, 1945. His widow died in 1961.

References

1875 births
1945 deaths
BNY Mellon